
Year 365 (CCCLXV) was a common year starting on Saturday (link will display the full calendar) of the Julian calendar. At the time, it was known in the West as the Year of the Consulship of Augustus and Valens (or, less frequently, year 1118 Ab urbe condita). The denomination 365 for this year has been used since the early medieval period, when the Anno Domini calendar era became the prevalent method in Europe for naming years.

Events 
 By place 
 Roman Empire 
 July 21 – An earthquake and tsunami devastates Crete and Alexandria and affects Italy, Greece, and Palestine..
 September 28 – Procopius revolts and bribes two legions passing by Constantinople. He proclaims himself Emperor, and takes control of Thrace and Bithynia.
 November 1 – The Alamanni cross the Rhine and invade Gaul. Emperor Valentinian I moves to Paris to command the army and defend the Gallic cities.

 China 
 March 30 – Sixteen Kingdoms: Jin Feidi, age 23, succeeds his brother Jin Aidi as emperor of the Eastern Jin Dynasty. He has no actual power; governmental matters are largely in the hands of his granduncle Sima Yu.

 By topic 
 Religion 
 Basil of Caesarea becomes presbyter of Caesarea.
 Emperor Valens orders the expulsion of the Alexandrian bishop Athanasius from his see, but instead of going into exile Athanasius, now about 67, moves to the outskirts of Alexandria.
 Antipope Felix II dies after a 9-year reign, ending the double occupancy of the papacy.

Births 
 Julius Agricola, Roman consul and praetorian prefect
 Kou Qianzhi, Chinese high official and taoist (d. 448)
 Tao Yuanming, Chinese poet and politician (d. 427)
 Tufa Rutan, Chinese prince of the Southern Liang (d. 415)

Deaths 
 March 30 – Ai of Jin (or Qianling), Chinese emperor (b. 341)
 November 22 – Felix II, antipope of Rome (b. 287) 
 Feng Yi (or Zizhuan), Chinese official and general
 Sima Xun (or Weichang), Chinese warlord (b. 306)
 Wang Muzhi, Chinese empress of the Jin Dynasty

References